Madhu Sudan (born 12 September 1966) is an Indian-American computer scientist. He has been a Gordon McKay Professor of Computer Science at the Harvard John A. Paulson School of Engineering and Applied Sciences since 2015.

Career
He received his bachelor's degree in computer science from IIT Delhi in 1987 and his doctoral degree in computer science at the University of California, Berkeley in 1992.  He was a research staff member at the IBM Thomas J. Watson Research Center in Yorktown Heights, New York from 1992 to 1997 and moved to MIT after that. From 2009 to 2015 he was a permanent researcher at Microsoft Research New England before joining Harvard University in 2015.

Research contribution and awards
He was awarded the Rolf Nevanlinna Prize at the 24th International Congress of Mathematicians (ICM) in 2002. The prize recognizes outstanding work in the mathematical aspects of computer science. Sudan was honored for his work in advancing the theory of probabilistically checkable proofs—a way to recast a mathematical proof in computer language for additional checks on its validity—and developing error-correcting codes. For the same work, he received the ACM's Distinguished Doctoral Dissertation Award in 1993 and the Gödel Prize in 2001 and was an Invited Speaker of the ICM in 1998. He is a Fellow of the ACM (2008). In 2012 he became a fellow of the American Mathematical Society. In 2014 he won the Infosys Prize in the mathematical sciences.
In 2017 he was elected to the National Academy of Sciences.
In 2021 he was awarded the IEEE Richard W. Hamming Medal for 2021.  

Sudan has made important contributions to several areas of theoretical computer science, including probabilistically checkable proofs, non-approximability of optimization problems, list decoding, and error-correcting codes.

References

External links
DBLP: Madhu Sudan
Madhu Sudan's Home Page
Bio from the Microsoft Research New England page

1966 births
Living people
Indian computer scientists
Indian emigrants to the United States
American computer scientists
Theoretical computer scientists
20th-century Indian mathematicians
University of California, Berkeley alumni
Massachusetts Institute of Technology faculty
Gödel Prize laureates
Nevanlinna Prize laureates
American people of Indian Tamil descent
Fellows of the Association for Computing Machinery
Fellows of the American Mathematical Society
IIT Delhi alumni
Scientists from Chennai
American academics of Indian descent
Members of the United States National Academy of Sciences
John A. Paulson School of Engineering and Applied Sciences faculty
Simons Investigator